Mountainair is a town in Torrance County, New Mexico, United States. It was founded in 1902 by John Corbett, Colonel E. C. Manning, and Elias S. Stover. The population was 928 at the 2010 census. It is part of the Albuquerque Metropolitan Statistical Area. The main visitor center for Salinas Pueblo Missions National Monument is located within the town.

Geography
Mountainair is located at  (34.519726, -106.243218).

According to the United States Census Bureau, the town has a total area of 1.0 square mile (2.7 km2), all land.

Demographics

As of the census of 2000, there were 1,116 people, 452 households, and 281 families residing in the town. The population density was 1,064.2 people per square mile (410.4/km2). There were 545 housing units at an average density of 519.7 per square mile (200.4/km2). The racial makeup of the town was 61.20% White, 1.79% African American, 1.61% Native American, 0.27% Asian, 0.09% Pacific Islander, 29.48% from other races, and 5.56% from two or more races. Hispanic or Latino of any race were 53.14% of the population.

There were 452 households, out of which 31.6% had children under the age of 18 living with them, 42.3% were married couples living together, 16.2% had a female householder with no husband present, and 37.8% were non-families. 35.2% of all households were made up of individuals, and 20.8% had someone living alone who was 65 years of age or older. The average household size was 2.47 and the average family size was 3.22.

In the town, the population was spread out, with 29.9% under the age of 18, 8.7% from 18 to 24, 20.4% from 25 to 44, 23.4% from 45 to 64, and 17.6% who were 65 years of age or older. The median age was 38 years. For every 100 females, there were 87.6 males. For every 100 females age 18 and over, there were 79.8 males.

The median income for a household in the town was $21,146, and the median income for a family was $25,125. Males had a median income of $25,625 versus $21,094 for females. The per capita income for the town was $12,566. About 19.3% of families and 24.7% of the population were below the poverty line, including 40.5% of those under age 18 and 15.7% of those age 65 or over.

Government
The Mayor of Mountainair is currently Peter Nieto. The town is represented by the Mountainair Town Council which includes Mayor Pro-Tem Jose Richard Torres, Juanita Carrillo, Ernie Lopez & Aurora Zamora. The Town Clerk is Dennis Fulfer. The Chief of Police is Juan Reyes, Jr. The Public Works Supervisor is Daniel Archuleta.

Education
Its school district is Mountainair Public Schools.

Notable person
Francine Neff, the 35th Treasurer of the United States, grew up on a small vegetable farm outside Mountainair.

References

External links

 Town website
 History of Mountainair, NM

Towns in Torrance County, New Mexico
Towns in New Mexico
Albuquerque metropolitan area